William Kendall (born 26 August 1903 in London, England – died 1 April 1984 aged 80) was a British film, stage and television actor. He appeared in the West End in several musicals starring Jack Buchanan including Mr. Whittington, Castle in the Air and This'll Make You Whistle. He starred in the 1953 play Four Winds by Alex Atkinson.

Filmography
 Face to Face (1922) as Bert Manners
 Goodnight, Vienna (1932) as Ernst
 The King's Cup (1933) as Captain Richards
 That's a Good Girl (1933) as Timothy
 Doctor's Orders (1934) as Jackson
 Debt of Honour (1936) as  Paul Martin
 This'll Make You Whistle (1936) as Reggie Benson
 Sweet Devil (1938) a sEdward Bane
 The Sky's the Limit (1938) as Thornwell Beamish
 Blind Folly (1939) as Raine
 Dance, Little Lady (1954) as Mr. Matthews
 Jumping for Joy (1956) as Blenkinsop
 Strictly Confidential (1959) as Major Rory McQuarry
 Idol on Parade (1959) as Commanding Officer
 Left Right and Centre (1959) as  Right - Pottle
 A Touch of Larceny (1960) as Tom
 The Trials of Oscar Wilde (1960) as Lord Ashford
 The Two Faces of Dr. Jekyll (1960) as Clubman (uncredited)
 Sands of the Desert (1960) as British Consul
 Live Now, Pay Later (1962) as Major Simpkins
 The Great St Trinian's Train Robbery (1966) as Mr. Parker
 The Jokers (1967) as Maj. Gen. Jeffcock
 Some Girls Do (1969) as Wing Commander Aston (uncredited)
 The Assassination Bureau (1969) as M. Marivaux at 'La Belle Amie' (uncredited)

References

External links

1903 births
1984 deaths
British male film actors
British male stage actors
20th-century British male actors
Male actors from London